Neurergus derjugini, the Kurdistan newt, Kordestan newt, Derjugin's (Kordestan) mountain newt, or yellow-spotted mountain newt, is a species of salamander in the family Salamandridae. It is found in Kurdistan in western Iran and in northeastern Iraq. There are two subspecies, Neurergus derjugini derjugini and Neurergus derjugini microspilotus, the latter is sometimes known as the Avroman Dagh newt.

Taxonomy
The species was first described by Pyotr Nesterov in 1916 based on a population in the Surkev Mountains. He described a second population from the Avroman region as a subspecies microspilotus which varied in the number of yellow spots and the spots being more circular. The two have been considered subspecies and only show minor differences in their mitochondrial DNA sequences and slightly more prominent differences in a nuclear gene sequence.

Etymology
The species name derjugini commemorates the collector Konstantin Deryugin.

Habitat and conservation
It is threatened by droughts, water extraction, pollution, and collection for pet trade. It is known from a small number of populations, most of them very small.

References

derjugini
Amphibians of Iran
Amphibians of Iraq
Amphibians described in 1916
Taxonomy articles created by Polbot